Bijar Kenar (also Romanized as Bījār Kenār; also known as Bidzharkinar and Bījār Kinār) is a village in Pasikhan Rural District, in the Central District of Rasht County, Gilan Province, Iran. At the 2006 census, its population was 1,063, in 267 families.

References 

Populated places in Rasht County